Helter Stupid is Negativland's fifth studio album, released in 1989. It is a concept album that focuses on a hoax that the band started, which claimed that the Negativland song "Christianity Is Stupid" inspired a teenager to murder his family with an axe.

Structure
The first half of the album is composed of the tracks "Prologue" and "Helter Stupid".  The two together form an extended piece lasting over 22 minutes.  The concept, and some of the sampled material, came from a San Francisco television news program that was duped by a media hoax perpetrated by Negativland while promoting its previous album, Escape from Noise.  Other samples used included those from Rev. Estus Pirkle (further samples from the same sermon used in "Christianity Is Stupid"), an interview with Charles Manson, and what was the band's most brazenly unauthorized sample to date: "Helter Skelter" by The Beatles.

Parts of the "Perfect Cut" tracks on Side 2 draw from samples of "The Winning Score", a 1977 presentation by TM Century, producers of radio jingles and imaging.

In 2000, the band Chumbawamba, in reply to the EP The ABCs of Anarchism, used this album as one of their main sampling sources of WYSIWYG.

Critical reception
Trouser Press wrote that "as inspired propagandists coming to terms with an ability to manipulate the truth, Negativland shifted their mindfuck campaign to a higher plane with Helter Stupid. The Rough Guide to Rock called Helter Stupid "probably [the band's] best and most accessible album."

Track listing
"Prologue"
"Helter Stupid"
"The Perfect Cut (Canned Music)"
"The Perfect Cut (Rooty Poops)"
"The Perfect Cut (Good As Gold)"
"The Perfect Cut (Piece of Meat)"
"The Perfect Cut (White Rabbit And A Dog Named Gidget)"
"The Perfect Cut (11 Minutes)"
"The Perfect Cut (48 Hours)"

Personnel
Richard Lyons (credited as "Dick Vaughn")
David Wills (uncredited)
Don Joyce (uncredited)
Mark Hosler (uncredited)
Chris Grigg (uncredited)

Musical Samples
The Beatles - "Helter Skelter"
King Floyd - "Groove Me"
Carol Douglas - "Doctor's Orders"
Minnie Riperton - "Lovin' You"
Tavares - "Heaven Must Be Missing an Angel" & "It Only Takes a Minute"
Zapp (unidentified)
Brothers Johnson - "Strawberry Letter 23"
Brick - "Dazz"
Natalie Cole - "This Will Be"
Joe Tex - "I Gotcha"
Donna Summer - "Love to Love You Baby"
Bebu Silvetti - "Spring Rain"
Bill Summers & Summer Heat - "Jam the Box"
Mungo Jerry - "In the Summertime"

References

1989 albums
Concept albums
Negativland albums